Daugvinas Zujus (born 16 October 1975 in Birštonas, Kaunas) is a retired male racewalker from Lithuania. He competed for his native Baltic country in the men's 50 km race walk event at three consecutive Summer Olympics, starting in 1996 (Atlanta, Georgia). Zujus set his personal best (3:55:10) in the same distance on 6 June 1998 in Ogre, Latvia.

Achievements

References
 
 

1975 births
Living people
Lithuanian male racewalkers
Athletes (track and field) at the 1996 Summer Olympics
Athletes (track and field) at the 2000 Summer Olympics
Athletes (track and field) at the 2004 Summer Olympics
Olympic athletes of Lithuania
People from Birštonas